Roy D. Buol served as mayor of Dubuque, Iowa from 2005 to 2021. Buol graduated from Wachusett Regional High School in Holden, Massachusetts. A native of Dubuque, Buol served as the Second Ward's city council representative from 1995 to 2005. In 2005 he was elected mayor. He was reelected in 2009, 2013, and 2017. He was replaced by Brad Cavanaugh as mayor in 2021.

Earlier career
Buol worked at John Deere Dubuque Works for over 30 years until his retirement. In 2002 he accepted a position as building and grounds director at the University of Dubuque.

Elected office
In 1995, Buol was elected as a city councilman of Dubuque. He served for ten years, until his election as mayor in 2005.

Running for mayor, Buol espoused a vision of making Dubuque one of the most environmentally sustainable cities in the U.S. Buol's vision is one of the main reasons that IBM chose Dubuque as a test city for its "Insights in Motion" program. Mayor Buol established an annual "Growing Sustainable Communities" Conference in Dubuque. In 2013 Dubuque won the U.S. Environmental Protection Agency's annual National Award for Smart Growth Achievement, thanks in large part to Buol, who is also a member of Smart Growth America’s Local Leaders Council. Through Buol’s work with America’s River Project, the Port of Dubuque has been developed with nearly $400 million for educational, entertainment, and historic riverfront projects, including the Mississippi Riverwalk, the River's Edge Plaza, and the Alliant Energy Amphitheater. He was also a supporter of the Bee Branch Restoration Project.

Buol's goals also include economic prosperity, promoting culture and heritage, higher quality of life, and healthier living. In a 2010 "Blueprint America report" by Jim Lehrer, reporter Miles O'Brien said that Dubuque's drive to become a sustainable city was being noticed "far beyond the banks of the Mississippi" and that Buol was leading the charge.

Awards
 2014 Public Leadership in the Arts Award for Local Arts Leadership for cities with a population of less than 100,000.

References

External links
 Mayor Roy D. Buol on the City of Dubuque Official Website.

Iowa Democrats
Mayors of Dubuque, Iowa
Living people
Year of birth missing (living people)